Iridomyrmex bigi is a species of ant that is native to several regions of Australia. Belonging to the genus Iridomyrmex, the species was first described by Shattuck in 1993.

References

Iridomyrmex
Hymenoptera of Australia
Insects described in 1993